Elliott Porter (born 31 December 1991) is a British racing cyclist .

Palmares

2011
1st Surrey League Individual Rider Overall Ranking 
2012
6th, Bec CC Road Race
7th, U23 National Time Trial Championships 
9th, London Dynamo Summer Road Race
2013
2nd, Peter Young Memorial Road Race
6th, Youth Classification, An Post Ras
8th, London Phoenix Road Race
9th, British National U23 Time Trial Championships
2014
1st, One Day in Dorset
1st, Prologue (TTT), Mzansi Tour
1st, John and Dulcie Walker Trophy
2nd, Mountains Classification, Tour de Korea
7th, Overall, SERRL Spring Stage Race
1st, Stage 1 (ITT)
2016
15th Tour of the Resiviour stage 2
16th Tour of the Resiviour GC 
13th Wiltshire GP
13th Beaumont 
24th British National Road Race Championships 
1st Suir Valley 3 day stage race stage 4
5th Suir Valley 3 day stage race GC
2017
13th An Post Ras GC 
2nd Beachy Head Classic 
10th Tour of the Resiviour GC

References 

1991 births
Living people
British male cyclists